Amanda Kathleen Brailsford is an American judge who has served on the Idaho Court of Appeals since 2019. She is a nominee to serve as a United States district judge of the United States District Court for the District of Idaho.

Education 

Brailsford grew up in Hagerman, Idaho. She received a Bachelor of Arts from the University of Idaho in 1989 and a Juris Doctor from the University of Idaho College of Law in 1993.

Career 

After graduating law school, she served as a law clerk for Judge Thomas G. Nelson of the United States Court of Appeals for the Ninth Circuit from 1993 to 1995. Brailsford worked at the Boise office of Holland & Hart LLP as an associate from 1995 to 2002 and as a partner from 2003 to 2013. She was a founding partner of the law firm of Andersen Banducci PLLC from 2013 to 2017. On November 30, 2018, she was appointed as a judge of the Idaho Court of Appeals by Governor Butch Otter to the seat vacated by the retirement of Judge Sergio Gutierrez. She assumed office in 2019.

Notable rulings 

 In 2022, Brailsford wrote the opinion for the Idaho Court of Appeals affirming an aggravated DUI conviction for Cyrus Buehler. Buehler was accused of being intoxicated while driving his pickup that struck a man operating a motorized bicycle. 

 Also in 2022, Brailsford wrote the opinion for the court affirming Shoshone County Sheriff Darrell Michael Gunderson's decision to deny a concealed weapons license to Robert Ervin Peterson. Gunderson disqualified Peterson due to his prior conviction of possessing material sexually exploiting children.

Nomination to district court 

On January 18, 2023, President Joe Biden announced his intent to nominate Brailsford to serve as a United States district judge of the United States District Court for the District of Idaho. On January 31, 2023, her nomination was sent to the Senate. President Biden nominated Brailsford to the seat vacated by Judge B. Lynn Winmill, who assumed senior status on August 16, 2021. Her nomination is pending before the Senate Judiciary Committee.

References 

Living people
Year of birth missing (living people)
Place of birth missing (living people)
20th-century American women lawyers
20th-century American lawyers
21st-century American women judges
21st-century American judges
21st-century American women lawyers
21st-century American lawyers
Idaho lawyers
Idaho state court judges
People from Gooding County, Idaho
University of Idaho alumni
University of Idaho College of Law alumni